Ibrahim El Khalil Bekakchi (born January 10, 1992, in Sétif) is an Algerian footballer who plays for USM Alger in the Algerian Ligue Professionnelle 1.

Club career
In July 2014, Bekakchi was loaned out to CA Bordj Bou Arréridj for two years.

In 2016, Ibrahim Bekakchi signed a contract with JS Saoura.

In 2019, Ibrahim Bekakchi signed a two-year contract with ES Sétif.

In 2021, Ibrahim Bekakchi signed a two-year contract with USM Alger.

International
In 2009, Bekakchi was selected as a member of the Algeria under-17 team at the 2009 FIFA U-17 World Cup in Nigeria.

References

External links
 
 

1992 births
Algerian footballers
Algeria youth international footballers
Algerian Ligue Professionnelle 1 players
Algerian Ligue 2 players
CA Bordj Bou Arréridj players
ES Sétif players
Living people
JS Saoura players
Footballers from Sétif
USM Alger players
Association football defenders
21st-century Algerian people